The 2023 IIHF World Championship will be co-hosted by Tampere, Finland and Riga, Latvia. The tournament is scheduled to be held from 12 to 28 May 2023, and will be organized by the International Ice Hockey Federation (IIHF).

Host nation bid
The event was originally planned to be held in Saint Petersburg, Russia, but in February 2022 the International Olympic Committee (IOC) called for Russia and Belarus to be stripped of hosting rights to all international sporting events due to the Russian invasion of Ukraine. On 26 April 2022, Russia lost their rights to host the World Championship.

After being promoted to the top division, Slovenia and Hungary both bid to co-host the event in Ljubljana and Budapest. The bid was withdrawn due to Hungarian Ice Hockey Federation informing the IIHF that it did not receive the governmental guarantees to host. Finland and Latvia submitted a joint bid, with Nokia Arena in Tampere and Arena Riga in Riga as potential host venues. On 27 May 2022, the IIHF confirmed that Finland and Latvia will host the tournament, with Finland having also hosted the 2022 IIHF World Championship in Tampere (Nokia Arena) and Helsinki (Helsinki Ice Hall).

Venues

Participants
 Qualified as hosts

 Automatic qualifier after a top 14 placement at the 2022 IIHF World Championship

 Qualified through winning a promotion at the 2022 IIHF World Championship Division I

Seeding
The seedings in the preliminary round are based on the 2022 IIHF World Ranking, as of the end of the 2022 IIHF World Championship, using the serpentine system while allowing the organizer, "to allocate a maximum of two teams to separate groups".

Group A (Tampere)
 (1)
 (4)
 (5)
 (9)
 (10)
 (13)
 (15)
 (20)

Group B (Riga)
 (2)
 (6)
 (7)
 (8)
 (11)
 (12)
 (16)
 (19)

Preliminary round
The groups were announced on 29 May 2022, with the schedule being revealed on 8 September 2022.

Group A

Group B

Playoff round

References

External links
Official website

 
2023 Men
2023 IIHF Men's World Ice Hockey Championships
2023 in ice hockey
International ice hockey competitions hosted by Finland
International ice hockey competitions hosted by Latvia
2023 in Finnish sport
2023 in Latvian sport
Scheduled ice hockey competitions
Sports events affected by the 2022 Russian invasion of Ukraine
Sports competitions in Tampere
Sports competitions in Riga
May 2023 sports events in Europe